Zbigniew Sawan (14 April 1904 – 4 June 1984) was a Polish stage and film actor. He appeared in more than 25 films between 1928 and 1984. Studied directing in Państwowy Instytut Sztuki Teatralnej.

Selected filmography
 Huragan (1928)
 Pod banderą miłości (1929)
 Uwiedziona (1931)
 Ostatnia brygada (1938)
 The Ashes (1965)

References

External links

1904 births
1984 deaths
Polish male film actors
Polish male silent film actors
Polish male stage actors
Polish theatre directors
Male actors from Warsaw
Officers of the Order of Polonia Restituta
Auschwitz concentration camp prisoners
20th-century Polish male actors
Artists from Białystok